Disconeura is a genus of moths in the family Erebidae. The genus was erected by Felix Bryk in 1953.

Species
Disconeura dissimilis
Disconeura drucei
Disconeura inexpectata
Disconeura linaza
Disconeura lutosa
Disconeura peculiaris
Disconeura soror

Former species
Disconeura tristriata

References

External links

Phaegopterina
Moth genera